"Unsteady" is a song by American rock band X Ambassadors. It was originally part of the band's second EP The Reason and was later released as the third single from the band's debut studio album, VHS, on October 13, 2015. The song has a remix version entitled "Unsteady (Erich Lee Gravity Remix)", a single for the motion picture soundtrack for the film ''Me Before You.

Composition
According to the sheet music published at MusicNotes.com, the song is written in the key of B minor, with a tempo of 58 beats per minute.

Accolades
"Unsteady" was nominated for Top Rock Song at the 2017 Billboard Music Awards.

Music video

Influenced by the song’s theme of divorce, the music video follows a couple at two points in their relationship: the moment they fell in love, and the moment they knew their relationship was over. The song shows how habits that may have been "fun and spontaneous" when young can turn into serious problems when they begin to affect an adult family life where children can be influenced by those choices.

The video was directed by ENDS (Zack Sekuler, Daniel Iglesias Jr.)

Charts

Weekly charts

Year-end charts

Decade-end charts

Certifications

References

2015 singles
2014 songs
2010s ballads
X Ambassadors songs
Kidinakorner singles
Interscope Records singles
Song recordings produced by Alex da Kid
Songs written by Alex da Kid
Pop ballads